The Church of St Michael and all Angels, Garton on the Wolds, in the East Riding of Yorkshire is a church of medieval origins that was built c.1132 for the prior of Kirkham Abbey. Long connected to the Sykes family of Sledmere, Sir Tatton Sykes, 4th Baronet engaged John Loughborough Pearson to undertake a major reconstruction of the building in 1856–1857. Sykes son, the fifth baronet, employed George Edmund Street to design a series of murals for interior decoration, depicting a range of bible stories. The murals, "dirty and decaying" when Nikolaus Pevsner recorded the church in his 1972 East Yorkshire volume for the Buildings of England series, were restored in 1985–1991 in Pevsner's memory by the Pevsner Memorial Trust. 

The church remains an active parish church and is a Grade I listed building.

History
The architectural historian David Neave writes that the benefice was granted to the abbey by Walter Espec in 1121 and the church rebuilt shortly thereafter. Further work was undertaken in the 14th and 15th centuries, including the construction of the upper stage of the tower. By the 19th century, the church was in a state of dilapidation, and Sir Tatton Sykes the Fourth brought in J. L. Pearson to undertake a complete restoration in 1855–1857. Most of the existing building is his, with the exception of the tower and "two or three features". Sir Tatton Sykes the Fifth dismissed Pearson in 1865, and recruited G. E. Street to undertake the internal decoration. In total, Sykes expended some £150,000 on the building and restoration of Anglican churches on his Yorkshire estates. David Neave notes that, despite Sykes' prodigality, "the residents of Garton (remained) stubbornly Methodist".

The Victorian wall murals were produced in 1865 by the notable firm of Clayton and Bell. They cover almost the entirety of the interior of the church and present a series of scenes from the bible. The total cost of the decoration was some £3,000. The mid-19th century was a period of great turbulence for the established church, the publication of Charles Darwin's On the Origin of Species in 1859, had challenged orthodox thinking on the creation of the world. The historian Jill Allibone suggests that the murals were Sykes's, and his vicar's, rebuttal of Darwinian heresy.

Writing of the murals in his 1972 guide to York and the East Riding, when their condition was already "pitiful", Pevsner noted, "it is essential that they be preserved". By the time of Pevsner's death just over a decade later, the murals were "hideously disfigured by damp and dirt". A number of Pevsner's friends and colleagues had planned to raise a sum of money to fund a restoration project in his memory and the architectural historian John Newman chaired the fundraising committee, the Pevsner Memorial Trust. In Bridget Cherry and Simon Bradley's volume, The Buildings of England: A Celebration, he records how the committee identified the murals at St Michael and All Angels as a suitable project and worked to raise the £100,000 required. David Neave's 2005 revision to the guide records their restoration and preservation in 1986–1991.

The church remains an active parish church and holds regular services.

Architecture and description
The church is built of sandstone ashlar. The first two storeys of the three-storey tower date from the original 12th century construction. The top storey is later, from the 15th century, in a Perpendicular style. The doorway, although in an Early Gothic style, is part of Pearson's rebuilding. The church has a number of significant examples of Romanesque carvings.

The murals in the nave depict scenes from the Old Testament, those in the chancel from the New. They are acknowledged as among the finest of Clayton and Bell's work. The stained glass is also by them, as are the painted roofs. The Cosmati paving in the chancel and nave is later, dating from Pearson's re-engagement in 1878. Pearson had seen examples of such work dating from the 12th century during his travels in Italy. Neave notes that it "has not worn well". The dado of tiles in a "Spanish" style, which runs under the murals, was manufactured by Frederick Garrard of Millwall at a cost of £166.

The church is a Grade I listed building.

References

Sources

External links

 Blog with a selection of photographs of the church

Church of England church buildings in the East Riding of Yorkshire
Grade I listed churches in the East Riding of Yorkshire